The French Foundation for the Study of Human Problems, often referred to as the Alexis Carrel Foundation or the Carrel Foundation, was a eugenics organization created by Nobel laureate in Medicine Alexis Carrel under the Vichy regime in World War II France.

Alexis Carrel spent most of his career at the Rockefeller Institute in New York and returned to France just before the outbreak of World War II. Carrel, who had worked previously with Philippe Pétain during the First World War, accepted an offer to establish and lead a foundation for the study of human problems. Its ambitious mission was to give an account of the "human element associating the soul and the body".

Charged with "the comprehensive study of the most appropriate measures needed to safeguard, improve, and advance the French people in all their activities," the Foundation was created by decree of the Vichy regime in 1941, and Carrel was appointed as "regent".

The Foundation initiated studies on demographics (Robert Gessain, Paul Vincent, Jean Bourgeois), nutrition (Jean Sutter), and housing (Jean Merlet), as well as the first polls (Jean Stoetzel). The foundation employed 300 researchers from the summer of 1942 to the end of the autumn of 1944.

The Foundation made many positive accomplishments during its time. It promoted the 16 December 1942 Act which established the prenuptial certificate, which was required before marriage and which sought to insure the good health of the spouses, in particular in regard to sexually transmitted diseases (STD) and "life hygiene".

Carrel was suspended after the liberation of Paris in August 1944 and died soon thereafter, thus avoiding the inevitable purge. The Foundation itself was "purged", but resurfaced soon after as the French Institute for Demographic Studies (INED) after the war. Most members of Carrel's team moved to INED, led by demographist Alfred Sauvy, who coined the expression "Third World". Others joined Robert Debré's  which later became INSERM.

See also 

 Collaboration with the Axis Powers during World War II
 Human enhancement
 Institut national d'études démographiques
 International Eugenics Conference
 Nazi eugenics
 Philippe Pétain
 Révolution nationale

References 

Notes

Citations

Works cited 

 

 

 

 

 

1941 in France
1942 in France
1943 in France
1944 documents
Bioethics
Eugenics
France in World War II
German occupation of France during World War II
Government of France
Pseudo-scholarship
Technological utopianism
Vichy France